Kweneng is a village in Kweneng District of Botswana. The village is located around 75 km North-northwest of Mochudi. Kweneng has a primary school and the population was 415 in 2001 census.

References

Kweneng District
Villages in Botswana